"Affair of the Heart" is a hit song performed by rock musician Rick Springfield. It was released as the lead single from his Platinum-certified Living in Oz album.

The song peaked at No. 9 on the Billboard Hot 100 and at No. 10 on the Cash Box Top 100 in mid-1983. It was the fourth of Springfield's five Top 10 hits to date.

Cash Box said the song "shows a greater use of synthesizers and a hardened guitar sound" than previous Springfield songs, but retains his ability to create a powerful refrain. 

"Affair of the Heart" was nominated for a Grammy Award for Best Male Rock Vocal Performance in 1984, but lost to "Beat It" by Michael Jackson.

At the premier of the live performance of “Live and Kickin’” in 1982, Rick was using a urinal in a public bathroom and some stranger came up to him and handed him a cassette saying “You gotta hear this song.  I wrote this song.  You’ll love it!”  a couple of months later while driving to the set of General Hospital, Rick played the cassette and hears the opening beats of the song.

In popular culture
Australian Broadcasting Corporation's television arm used an instrumental bit from this song as the background music for its 1984 logo.

Charts

References

1983 singles
Rick Springfield songs
1983 songs
Songs written by Rick Springfield
RCA Records singles